Maurice Berkley (6 September 1872 – 9 August 1947) was an English cricketer.  Berkley was a right-handed batsman who bowled right-arm slow.  He was born in Navestock, Essex and educated at Fettes College in Edinburgh, where he played for the college cricket team.

Berkley played for Essex twice in the 1894 County Championship against Yorkshire and Leicestershire. In his two matches, he scored 6 runs at a batting average of 3.00, with a high score of 5. More successful in the bowling department, Berkley took 7 wickets at a bowling average of 14.71. six of his wickets came in a single innings in his maiden first-class match against Yorkshire, claiming 6/50.

He died in Bangor, Caernarvonshire on 9 August 1947.

References

External links
Maurice Berkley at ESPNcricinfo
Maurice Berkley at CricketArchive

1872 births
1947 deaths
People from the Borough of Brentwood
People educated at Fettes College
English cricketers
Essex cricketers